Euclemensoides is a genus of moths in the subfamily Arctiinae. It contains the single species Euclemensoides umbrata, which is found in Colombia.

References

Natural History Museum Lepidoptera generic names catalog

Lithosiini